Boca grande is Spanish for big mouth. It may also refer to:

Places
Bocagrande, Cartagena de Indias, Bolívar, Colombia
Bocagrande channel, Cartagena Bay, Cartagena, Colombia
Boca Grande, Florida, United States
Boca Grande, Venezuela
Boca Grande Key, Florida, United States

Other
Boca Grande Community Center, also known as Boca Grande School, a historic site in Boca Grande, Florida
Boca Grande Quarantine Station, a historic site in Boca Grande, Florida
Boca Grande Taqueria, a restaurant in Boston, Massachusetts
Port Boca Grande Light, part of the Gasparilla Island Lights in Boca Grande, Florida

See also

 Boca Chica (disambiguation)
 
 
 
 
 Grande (disambiguation)
 Boca (disambiguation)